The 1921 UCI Track Cycling World Championships were the World Championship for track cycling. They took place in Copenhagen, Denmark from 30 July to 8 August 1921. Three events for men were contested, two for professionals and one for amateurs.

Medal summary

Medal table

See also
 1921 UCI Road World Championships

References

Track cycling
UCI Track Cycling World Championships by year
International cycle races hosted by Denmark
International sports competitions in Copenhagen
1921 in track cycling